Calday Grange Grammar School (abbreviated to CGGS; also known as Calday Grange, Calday Grammar or simply Calday due to the difference in spelling to the nearby village of Caldy) is a non-denominational, academically selective grammar school, founded in 1636, situated on Caldy Hill in Grange, a suburb of West Kirby on the Wirral peninsula, England. The school admits boys from age 11 to 18 and, since 1985, girls for the sixth form only. The school has academy status, hosts the Wirral Able Children Centre, and has been awarded Sportsmark Gold and Investors in People status.

Geography
The school stands in a residential area of Wirral close to the Dee Estuary. Students come primarily from the Wirral, Deeside and Cheshire areas. The main site at the top of Caldy Hill is occupied by the school buildings, sports cages and field, with a larger field and swimming pool building located over Grammar School Lane. A mile southeast of the main school buildings, along Telegraph Road, is the school's Glasspool Fields Sports Facility including 3 rugby pitches, a cricket square and a sand-based artificial hockey field. The school is surrounded by suburban housing and the protected heathlands and woods of Grange, Caldy and Thurstaston.

School history and status

Founded in 1636, Calday Grange Grammar School is Wirral's oldest surviving grammar school. It was established as a free grammar school on the present site by local landowner William Glegg. From when it started with 12 pupils, the school has grown into an establishment of over 1300 students – which includes over 400 male and female students in the Sixth Form.

Calday Grange Grammar School became a trust school on 1 January 2009, transferring ownership of the school land and buildings to a Charitable Trust called "The Calday Grange Trust". The Calday Grange Trust is a partnership between Calday Grange Grammar School, The University of Liverpool, Unilever Research and Development and Maestro Services Ltd. Calday Grange Grammar School was the first Wirral School to convert to Trust Status.

In September 2011, the school informed parents that "The School has received notification from Companies House that the Calday Grange Trust Company has been dissolved. This has been notified to the Governing Body who contacted Wirral Local Authority and indicated their wish to revert to the Foundation Schools Instrument of Government".

In July 2011, the process for converting to an academy school was begun, and the school converted to academy status with effect from 1 January 2013.

Performance

In 2019 the school was inspected and judged 'Good' repeating the judgement of Ofsted from inspections in 2016 and 2010.

In 2015 96% of the year group achieved 5 GCSE passes at grades A* to C with 96.2% gaining at 5 A* to C grades including English and Maths. Four students achieved 10 or more A* grades.

In 2015 Calday School received its best A level results since 2010 with a pass rate of 99.2% at A*-E grades.

Extracurricular

Sport
The school is the 7th state school for sporting achievement. The top state schools were revealed in the November 2019 edition of School Sport magazine and it places the school in the top 1% of schools in the country for sporting outcomes.

Combined Cadet Force
The school maintains a Combined Cadet Force. The combined Cadet force has been at Calday since 1916, when a unit of the
Officers' Training Corps was first formed.

Other

Volunteering opportunities include supporting the Refilwe Community Project in South Africa which the school has been involved in for over 9 years. Students have also been involved with various independent entrepreneurial pursuits.

Houses
The school has three Houses named after past benefactors and headmasters. Members of each house are identified by different coloured stripes on the school tie from years 7 to 11.

 Bennett – named after Thomas Bennett, benefactor of the school in 1676.

 Glegg – named after William Glegg, founder of the school in 1636.

 Hollowell – named after Rev. William Hollowell, former headmaster 1891–1920.

There was a fourth house,  Paton, named after Sir Alfred Paton. It was taken out of the house system in the 1990s for simplicity in form-group allocation.

Notable former students

 Andrew Baddeley - Athlete in the 2008 and 2012 Olympics.
 Matthew Barnes – Musician, performing as Forest Swords
 David Belbin - author
 William Bennett Bond – Archbishop of Montreal
 John Bowe – actor
 Steve Bower – Former Setanta presenter; football commentator for the BBC and ITV
 Daniel Craig - Actor
 Bobby Crutchley - Head Coach of the England and Great Britain Hockey teams
 Steve Cummings- English racing cyclist for World Tour cycling team
 Sam Dickinson - England Saxons and Northampton Saints rugby union player
 Chris Eakin - BBC News presenter
 Michael Eakin - Chief Executive of the Royal Liverpool Philharmonic
 Sir Herbert William Emerson (1881–1962), Governor of Punjab
 Will Foster – Member of rock band The Tears
 Cyril Edward Gourley – Victoria Cross recipient
 Raymond Towers Holmes – RAF pilot in Battle of Britain
 Paul Humphreys – member of band Orchestral Manoeuvres in the Dark
 James Hype - DJ, producer and remix artist
 Geoffrey Anketell Studdert Kennedy – "Woodbine Willy"; First World War poet; taught at Calday 1905–1907.
 Craig Lindfield – Formerly Liverpool F.C. player, now at F.C. United of Manchester
 Philip May – banker, and husband of Theresa May
 Andy McCluskey – member of band Orchestral Manoeuvres in the Dark
 Jack Patterson - member of band Clean Bandit 
 Luke Patterson - member of band Clean Bandit
 Nick Power - Organist and songwriter with the band The Coral
 Sam Quek MBE - Team GB field hockey gold medallist
 David Raven – former Liverpool FC football player now at Warrington
 Bill Steer – guitarist in the band Napalm Death 1987–1989, member of grind-pioneers Carcass
 Ray Stubbs – BT Sport and Talksport presenter
 Dick Uren – England international rugby union player.
 Sir David Weatherall – Oxford physician; editor Oxford Textbook of Medicine; former Chancellor Keele University
 Dr. David Wynn-Williams (1946–2002) – British astro-biologist, head of the Antarctic astrobiology project, British Antarctic Survey.
 Dougal Wilson, director of advertisements and music videos

• John Morgan - professional golfer European tour , European Seniors Tour and US Champions Tour

Headteachers

References

Sources
 Protheroe, M. J. (1976). A History of Calday Grange Grammar School, West Kirby, 1636–1976. West Kirby: The Parents' Association.

External links
 

Boys' schools in Merseyside
1636 establishments in England
Educational institutions established in the 1630s
Grammar schools in the Metropolitan Borough of Wirral
Academies in the Metropolitan Borough of Wirral